The High Commissioner of Australia to India is an officer of the Australian Department of Foreign Affairs and Trade and the head of the High Commission of the Commonwealth of Australia to India in New Delhi. The position has the rank and status of an Ambassador Extraordinary and Plenipotentiary and is currently held by the former Premier of New South Wales, Barry O'Farrell, since 21 May 2020. The high commissioner also holds non-resident accreditation as Ambassador to Bhutan since diplomatic relations were established on 14 September 2002. On 21 May 2020, O'Farrell presented his commission to the President of India, Ram Nath Kovind, in India's first-ever virtual credentials ceremony. On 7 October 2022, O'Farrell presented his credentials as ambassador to the King of Bhutan, Jigme Khesar Namgyel Wangchuck, at Tashichho Dzong in Thimphu.

The Australian Government has offered diplomatic representation in India since 1943. Between 1960 and 1986, the high commissioner also had non-resident accreditation as Ambassador to Nepal. A resident Australian Embassy in Nepal was opened on 27 April 1984, but the first resident ambassador was not appointed until 4 May 1986. The high commission's work is assisted by multiple consulates throughout the country that have visiting and reporting responsibilities, as well as handling consular and trade matters for the high commission.

List of High Commissioners

Notes
: Also non-resident Ambassador to Nepal, 1960–1986.
: Also non-resident Ambassador to Bhutan, 2002–present.

Consuls-General

Mumbai
The consulate-general was first opened in Bombay on the 21 August 1967, initially with a Deputy High Commissioner in charge until 1973, but was closed on the 30 April 1976 due to financial constraints, before being reopened on 6 February 1979. An Australian Trade Commission had been located in the city since 1939, with Roy Gollan (later high commissioner) serving as trade commissioner from 1939 to 1948.

Kolkata
On 18 June 1970, the post was originally opened as the Deputy High Commission, Calcutta, to replace the Trade Commission which had existed in the city since 1939. Like the Bombay post, the Deputy High Commission was downgraded to a consulate-general on 13 May 1973, before being closed in April 1976 due to budget constraints.

Chennai

References

External links

Australian High Commission, New Delhi – India, Bhutan
Australian Consulate-General Chennai, India
Australian Consulate-General Kolkata, India
Australian Consulate-General Mumbai, India

Australia and the Commonwealth of Nations
India and the Commonwealth of Nations
 
 
India
Australia
Australia